Later is a crime/horror novel written by American author Stephen King, published on March 2, 2021 by Hard Case Crime. The book is available in paperback format with a limited hardcover release. The paperback edition features cover art by Paul Mann, and the limited hardcover features cover art by Gregory Manchess. The 7 hour audiobook is read by Seth Numrich. This is King's third published work with Hard Case Crime, following the release of The Colorado Kid and Joyland.

The story is told in first person perspective using Jamie Conklin as the protagonist, who has the ability to see the ghosts of dead people.

The novel entered The New York Times fiction best-seller list at number two, in the week ending March 6, 2021.

Story 

Set in the late 2000s and early 2010s, Later is narrated by its main character Jamie, a young boy living with his single mother, Tia, in New York City. Jamie has the ability to see and talk to the ghosts of dead people. These ghosts must answer all his questions truthfully. When he was very young, Jamie was traumatized after a man who was killed in a car accident near Central Park waved at him, despite being dead. When he is a few years older, he also talks to Mona, the late wife of Professor Martin Burkett, a neighbor and friend of the Conklins. At the beginning of the story Jamie's mother is the only one who knows about his special skills. Jamie's uncle Harry (the older brother of Jamie's mother) lives in a care home due to having early onset Alzheimer's disease.

Jamie's mother Tia is a literary agent. Her star client, Regis Thomas, writes best-selling romance novels set in the Roanoke Colony. After the Great Recession, Jamie and his mother lose much of their money, but are still able to get by thanks to Thomas's work. Around this time, Tia begins dating Elizabeth "Liz" Dutton, a New York City Police Department detective. When Regis suddenly drops dead before finishing the final book in his Roanoke series, Tia fears her literary agency will face bankruptcy. She and Liz drive Jamie out to Regis's house, where he talks to the deceased author's ghost and tells his mother the plot of the final book. Tia writes the final book herself and publishes it. The book is a massive success and the Conklins earn much of their lost money back. Soon after, Tia finds drugs in the pocket of Liz's jacket. Outraged that she would bring drugs into her home, Tia breaks up with her and kicks Liz out of their apartment.

After about one year, when Jamie is in middle school, Liz, who is at risk of losing her job with the NYPD, picks up Jamie after school one day. Out of desperation, she has him use his ghost related skills so she can thwart the plot of the serial bomber Kenneth Therriault aka "Thumper". Therriault committed suicide after planting one final bomb somewhere in the city. So, Liz has Jamie talk to the ghost of Therriault, who reveals the bomb's location. After the incident, Jamie is haunted by Therriault, who does not vanish after a few days, unlike all the other dead spirits Jamie has talked with. Therriault follows Jamie and makes false prophecies about how his mother will die from cancer and how Jamie will develop Alzheimer's like his Uncle Harry. Jamie talks with his former neighbor, Professor Martin Burkett, who tells Jamie about an ancient Tibetan/Nepalese ritual, the "Ritual of Chüd", he could use to combat the demon possessing Therriault. Later, when Jamie sees Therriault again, he lunges at the ghost of the dead man and refuses to let go. Therriault, terrified, promises to leave Jamie alone. Jamie also makes the mysterious force that is possessing Therriault's ghost (what Jamie calls the "Dead Light") promise to come to him if he whistles for it. Soon after, Professor Burkett dies. Before departing, the ghost of Burkett speaks to Jamie and warns him not to ever summon the Dead Light.

After some months, Jamie is kidnapped by Liz, who, now a drug addict, admits she used her position as a cop to participate in drug trafficking. Liz forcibly takes Jamie to the mansion of her boss, a drug kingpin, who is hiding what Liz believes to be a giant supply of Oxycontin pills. Liz wants to find the pills to sell them and then use the money to move to the West Coast and change her identity. After murdering the drug kingpin, Donald Marsden, Liz forces Jamie to ask Marsden's ghost where he hid the drugs. Marsden leads them to a panic room in his library. Liz is enraged when she finds the pill supply is much smaller than she expected. Fearing for his life, Jamie whistles and summons Therriault/the Dead Light, which kills Liz. The Dead Light, now stronger, tries to break free of Jamie's control over it and make Jamie its slave. Jamie, refusing to give in, retains control of the Dead Light before forcing it to leave again. After the Dead Light vanishes, Jamie calls the police and is returned home safely.

Years later, when Jamie is about to finish high school, Tia calls him and tells him that Uncle Harry has died of pneumonia. Jamie travels to the care home, talks to the ghost of his dead uncle, and asks him who his father is. Harry says that he is Jamie's father. Jamie refuses to ask for the details of his incestuous conception and does not say anything to his mother. Jamie tries to remain hopeful about the future, but is troubled by the fact that he might develop early onset Alzheimer's like his uncle. This could be found out by a simple test, which, however, he wants to have carried out only "later".

Limited hardcover edition and audiobook
The limited hardcover edition of the book was published by Titan Books with 2,900 copies printed. It was released on March 30, 2021. Three editions of the hardcover were available: a Lettered Signed Edition with 26 copies, a Numbered Signed Edition with 374 copies and an Unsigned Edition with 2,500 copies.
Seth Numrich reads the unabridged audiobook.

References 

2021 American novels
Novels by Stephen King
American crime novels
Novels set in New York City
Incest in fiction